Böhme's grass skink (Trachylepis boehmei) is a species of lizard in the family Scincidae. The species is endemic to Ethiopia. It was first described in 2020.

Etymology
The specific name, boehmei, is in honor of German Herpetologist Wolfgang Böhme.

Description

Reproduction
T. boehmei is ovoviviparous.

References

Further reading
Koppetsch T (2020). "A new species of Trachylepis (Squamata: Scincidae) from The Amhara Region, Ethiopia, and a key to the Ethiopian Trachylepis ". Zootaxa 4859 (1): 113–126. (Trachylepis boehmei, new species).

Endemic fauna of Ethiopia
boehmei
Reptiles of Ethiopia
Reptiles described in 2020